The Eelume  is an autonomous underwater vehicle being developed by Eelume AS, in partnership with Kongsberg Maritime and Equinor.

Function
The Eelume is primarily designed to inspect, maintain and repair subsea infrastructure, primarily for offshore drilling installations. It may also have military applications, including for mine countermeasures and undersea surveillance.

The Eelume is intended to be able to dive 500 meters beneath the surface.

The Eelume is designed to be either entirely autonomous, or capable of being controlled remotely by an operator. The Eelume is intended to be deployed permanently underwater, housed at subsea docking stations.

Development
The Eelume was tested at the PREZIOSO Linjebygg Subsea Test Center near Trondheim in November and December 2016. Eelume CEO Arne Kjørsvik has said they anticipate the vehicle being available on the market in late 2019.

The company designing Eelume began in 2015 as a spinoff from the Norwegian University of Science and Technology (NTNU),
founded by a team of entrepreneurs including NTNU professor Kristin Ytterstad Pettersen.

External links
 Eelume website
 Eelume YouTube channel

References

Autonomous underwater vehicles
Kongsberg Gruppen